The Regional Housing Needs Assessment (RHNA) is a process mandated by California state law that requires that cities and unincorporated areas of counties to plan for new housing to accommodate projected growth.  RHNA operates on an eight-year cycle.  In each cycle, jurisdictions must submit their plans to the California Department of Housing and Community Development (HCD) for approval.  Jurisdictions which fail to adequately accommodate projected growth as determined by HCD are subject to fines from $10,000 per month to $600,000 per month.

References

Welfare in California